Serbian medieval law spans a period of time from the first half of the 7th century AD to the second half of the 15th century AD. While the origins of the Serbian medieval law can be traced back to folk customs and beliefs, the forms of written law started to appear owing to Serbian emperors, kings and archbishops of that era. It is through their charters and various codes that punishments were introduced and status, civil, criminal and procedural law started developing. Serbian medieval law was visibly influenced by the Byzantine law whose impact was profound.

Status Law 
As in other medieval states, in medieval Serbia there were classes- strata of population that had legally (and not only factually) different positions and privileges.

Data on the class structure of medieval Serbian society have been known since the time of Nemanjić. At that time, the upper class was aristocracy and was divided into velika (large nobility) and mala vlastela (lesser nobility) and vlastelicice; the privileged class was also the clergy, while the subordinate population had several categories under the general name of sebri.

Division of the classes

Vlastela (the Nobles) represented the highest class in the Serbian state, and before this name, the term boyar was known, but it didn't come to life. This division into “velika”(large nobility) and “mala” (lesser nobility) appears in the charter of Stefan Uros which was issued in the period from 1254 to 1264. and it is located in the monastery of St. Peter and Paul on Lim river. It is clear that this division is based on customary law, which can be concluded by the way it is later mentioned in the charter. They talk about this division as if everything is already known, without any additional and excessive explanation. Velika vlastela ( consisted of the largest landowners and the highest state dignitaries. Dušan's Code grants them one legal privilege by which they were summoned to court by a court summons, and the others were summoned by a court seal. Mala vlastela (lesser nobility) made up the majority of the privileged class, and vlasteličići were below the regular nobility, and that term was first mentioned in the contract of Stefan the First-Crowned with Dubrovnik. The lords came originated from the social class of soldiers and the lower nobility. The clergy had a privileged position because they were released from their obligations to the state for the reason that they prayed to God for the ruler and the entire nation, and not only for themselves.

The church layer was the most privileged layer and that layer was not only the clergy, but monasteries and churches. They were exempted from the main obligation, military obligations, and in addition they were exempted from paying income.

All the unprivileged inhabitants of that period were called Sebri. They depended on the Grand Prince and they were obliged to pay taxes and do various jobs. Most of the inhabitants of the parishes were free people, but directly subordinate to the state.

Meropsi were dependent farmers whose main responsibilities were growing grain and they were the most numerous category. They paid an annual tax and in addition to growing grain, they had to build and repair city fortifications, guard the city, give food to the ruler and his entourage, give oats and hay to the horses of the ruler and his entourage, and carry the ruler's belongings on their horses. In a way, they were protected by Dušan's code, through which they were given the right to sue their ruler if he asked them to do something beyond what was determined by law.

A special social group consisted of vlasi who were organized into katuns headed by headmen (princes, leaders,peddlers) and the katun was named after him. Their main occupation was cattle breeding. They, like the rest of the dependent population, paid certain burdens to their master. They paid the lord of the manor grass for the use of pastures and on their horses they had to transport salt from Primorje for the needs of the manor. They also served as auxiliary troops to the basic aristocratic army. The charters also mention various masters, craftsmen who worked in metal, wood, stone, earth, leather, textiles, etc. There were also chandlers, butchers, innkeepers, bakers, barbers, primitive surgeons and merchants called peddlers.

At the bottom of the social ladder are otroci who are completely dependent on their master. They could be sold and bought in the squares and had no right to seek mercy at the ruler's court.

The citizens were residents of coastal towns that didn't have a direct relationship with the Serbian state, but the towns in which they resided were part of medieval Serbia. Foreign traders who were mostly Venetians, Dubrovnik residents or residents of some other Dalmatian communes, were stranci. If they had disputes with the local population, they would resolve them in a mixed court.

Law sources 
The greatest part of Serbian medieval law can be studied through the customary law. As early as the end of the 12th century written law sources started to appear in the form of: charters, international treaties, codes of law and statutes. Among all sources, three of them hold the greatest significance: the Charter of Hilandar, the Nomocanon Zakonopravilo and Dušan's Code , which will be elaborated on below. Despite the existence of the written law, customary law has never been completely abandoned, as many customs from that era are performed even today, some to a lesser while others to a greater extent, while some have been incorporated into certain codes.

Customary law 
Although it is not known for certain whether there had been written legal sources in Serbia until the 12th century, customary law, as one of the sources, can be ascertain. Those customs are present even today, some to a lesser while others to a greater extent. In Serbia, customary law represents the most important legal source until the late 12th century, because it regulated how people lived. As can be guessed from its name, customary law is composed of customs, indicating what typical behaviour was supposed to be like according to unwritten rules traditionally rooted in a life of community or the whole nation. Numerous things were regulated by customary law, such as marriages and illicit relations, and customary law was also interwoven into criminal law. Marital relationships were regulated by means of customs even after the Christianization. One of the marital customs was marriage by abduction and it lasted for centuries. In Serbia customary law was in force until the late 19th century, and some instances of its application were noted even in the first half of the 20th century. Customary law also included vendetta. The Serbs are known to have believed in supernatural beings, such as vampires and werewolves. According to that belief, a deceased person could become a vampire within the first 40 days upon their death and commit misdeeds. According to common beliefs, such a creature could only be destroyed by thrusting a stake or burning its body.  A provision from Dušan’s Code made such a procedure illicit and punishable by making a culprit pay a fine called vražda. The Church also condemned those magical-religious practices. The birth of written law meant that the application of customary law gradually declined in importance, but did not altogether cease to exist. All legal relationships not regulated by some written law were still regulated by customary law, while some customs were incorporated into the charters and Dušan’s Code.

Charters 
A charter is a document which serves the purpose of granting some rights or privileges, as Serbian rulers used to do by issuing them to the Church, landed nobility and sometimes even to the privileged cities thereby conferring certain rights upon them.  The Charter of Chilandar by Stefan Nemanja dating from 1198/1199 is the oldest Serbian legal written source, making charters appear as the first written legal source. Although the fact that it is the oldest preserved charter holds special importance, it has to be said that one is just one of many important charters written by Stefan Nemanja. Serbian monarchs wrote their charters in Serbian-Slavic language, and later in Greek. They were written on paper or parchment, which was known to perish fast, as a result of which just a small number of charters have been preserved. A charter was composed of an introduction, body of the text and conclusion, while each of the parts mentioned contained its smaller parts. Charters can be classified as those relating to monasteries, cities and landed nobility, out of which the greatest number belonged to the category of monastery charters. Out of 165 monastery charters, the most important is the aforesaid one written by Stefan Nemanja, which served as the basis for the foundation of the Chilandar Monastery.  His son, Stefan the First-Crowned (Stefan Prvovenčani), endowed the Žiča monastery in 1220 and on two more occasions later with the charters whose text has been preserved on the monastery’s walls thus bringing important information about marital law of that time to us. Some other important charters are: Skopje charter from 1299/1300, by which king Milutin confirmed the grants from the Byzantine and Bulgarian monarchs to Saint Đorđe Monastery near Skopje, the Banjska Charter from 1313 to 1318, by which king Milutin founded and endowed his legacy St. Stefan Monastery in Banjska, king Milutin’s Charter for the Gračanica Monastery from 1312 was carved into an interior wall of the church, the Charters of Dečani were written in 1330 and 1343-1345, when king Stefan Dečanski provided grants for his legacy, the Charter of Prizren from 1348-1353 was the means by which emperor Dušan endowed his legacy- the St. Angels Mihajlo and Gavrilo Monastery near Prizren… Out of all landed nobility charters, only a dozen have been preserved, while out of all city charters only one has been preserved.

International treaties 
International treaties in Serbia during Middle Age were the means of establishing concessions for foreign merchants and regulating the relationships with them. Such treaties, which strengthened the economic development of the country, were mostly signed with Dubrovnik, and to a smaller extent with Venice, as well as with some other countries. The treaty Stefan Nemanja signed with Dubrovnik in 1186 is the oldest international treaty preserved. That treaty was a peace treaty with Dubrovnik after an abortive attempt to conquer it. At first, signing of those treaties was accompanied with a mutual pledge, each side swearing to fulfill the promise and commitments, but later, during the reign of king Dragutin, the treaties took the shape of a one-sided chart by which Serbian monarchs granted concessions to the merchants from Venice. The main characteristics of those treaties were that they were used to guarantee the freedom of movement for the merchants, compensation for the damage done, inviolability of the merchandise and total ban on reprisals. Adherence to those treaties resulted in a gradual emergence of some kind of an international law across Europe. The treaties also regulated some other important aspects, such as the customs duty the foreign merchants did not have to pay at first, which was later amended so they had to pay them at specially designated points. New duties were not introduced, as it was forbidden.

The Nomocanon Zakonopravilo 
Collection of laws comprising Canon law and Civil law in the Byzantine empire were nomocanons containing church regulations, imperial codes as well as the law experts’ interpretations. The content of the nomocanon were the holy apostles’ rules, 6 ecumenical councils’ rules, 10 regional councils’ rules and Church Fathers’ rules. Our most renowned nomocanon is the one written by Saint Sava titled “Zakonopravilo”, created after the Serbian Church had been granted autocephaly in 1219 or 1220. Archbishop Sava used the material from canonical law books as well as the collections of the Byzantine criminal, civil and procedural law which were translated in a law book Prochiron by emperor Basil I. The aim of the nomocanon “Zakonopravilo” was to secure the position of a newly-formed Church. “Zakonopravilo” contained the interpretations of Aristina and Zonara, but the original text has not been preserved. The oldest transcript is the transcript of Ilovica from 1262. There are  11 more transcripts: of Raška, Sarajevo, Dečani, Pčinja, Chilandar, Peć, Belgrade, Sava, Morač, the canon of Jovan Zlokruhović and a nomocanon of Szentendre. Even when Serbia lost its independence, “Zakonopravilo” remained the major legal source. Its greatest part was devoted to criminal law.

The Serbian nomocanon has no counterpart in any preserved Greek or Slavic text. Sava favoured the interpretations of Aleksij Aristin and Jovan Zonara instead of tendentious commentaries by Teodor Valsamon expressing the idea of the Byzantine emperor’s omnipotence severely restricting the independence, i.e. autocephaly of other churches. The Serbian nomocanon embraces the concept of “harmony” in the relationships between the Church and the state, rejecting all forms of “Caesaropapism” or “Eastern papism” (Constantinople patriarchate hegemony). The author chose not to include such law texts which would restrict the scope of the monarch’s rule, both in the secular and ecclesiastical domain of his own jurisdiction. As well as that, Sava left out all the excerpts from the Eclogue and Epanagogue where the submission of the Church to the state power was justified. “Zakonopravilo” by Saint Sava had a great impact not only on the Serbs but also all Orthodox Christians. It was first taken to Bulgaria as early as 1262, where it was accepted as a general mandatory nomocanon, and from where its second transcript was sent to Russia, to the bishop of the Metropolis Kiril II. At the council in Vladimir in 1274, “Krmčija“ was proclaimed as a mandatory nomocanon for the Russian Church.

Dušan’s Code 
Apart from “Zakonopravilo”, Dušan's Code   is another major written source of Serbian medieval law. This Code was adopted at the same time as the Empire was proclaimed. It was promulgated under the title “The Code of the Pious King Stefan” at the state Council in Skopje on 21 May 1349. The first part that was then adopted contained 135 articles, while the other one contained 66 articles. As far as the content of this Code, divided in articles, is concerned, articles 1 to 38 constitute a separate section on the church, 39-63 are provisions for the rights and duties of the landed nobility, 64-83 are provisions for the legal position of the dependent commoner class (sebri), 118-122 for the city dwellers class and merchants, 125 and 126 for the criminal accountability of the city and city land, 129-132 and 135 for the responsibility of a soldier and the conduct during a war, 143 and from 145 until 149 are provisions describing sanctions against thieves and robbers, 151-154 are provisions for the jury, while the subject of legality is defined in articles 136-139 and 140-142, 171 and 172. While the original text of the Code has not been preserved, there are 25 transcripts available to study from. The oldest transcripts are: the transcript of Struga (the end of the 14th century), of Aton (the beginning of the 15th century), of Bistrica (the middle of the 15th century), of Baranja (the end of the 15th century) and of Prizren (the end of the 15th century). The last one, the transcript of Prizren, is the most significant one as it appears to be a direct transcript of the original text. Out of later edition works, the transcript of Rakovica, produced in one if the monasteries in Fruška gora 1700, is the most important. It is assumed that Dušan’s Code was written on a long scroll with a golden hanging imperial seal. In Dušan’s Code there are more provisions of criminal, procedural and state law than those of church and civil law.

The abbreviated Syntagma 
The Syntagma is a collection of secular and ecclesiastical provisions which was produced by a monk from Thessaloniki Matija Vlastar in 1335. This nomocanon collection is divided into 24 chapters according to the Greek alphabet letters (from A to Ω). Probably by order of emperor Dušan himself, the Syntagma was translated into the Serbian language in 1347 or 1348, but immediately after it, it was heavily abbreviated. The original Syntagma contained 303 chapters, while its abbreviated version has only 24 chapters. There are two main reasons why Serbian editors performed such a heavy abbreviation:

-the first reason is ideological in nature. Matija Vlastar’s collection is based on Teodor Valsamon’s tendentious and one-sided commentaries emphasizing the omnipotence of the Byzantine emperor and his hegemony in the whole system of the states while denying the autocephaly of the Serbian and Bulgarian Churches. This is why the Serbian editors, right after the whole text of Syntagma had been translated, performed abbreviations, leaving out all provisions stipulating secular and spiritual dominance of Constantinople.

-the second reason is purely practical in nature: Syntagma was intended as a handbook for secular courts. Consequently, the majority of church-related provisions were left out, while only those relating to secular matters were kept, notably those from those law areas which were not regulated by Dušan’s Code. Bearing these facts in mind, it remains unclear why the Serbian editors had opted for Syntagma by Matija Vlastar, and not Heksabiblos by Konstantin Armenopulos, because Armenopulos was a far better law expert than Matija Vlastar and his collection was made up of only secular provisions without any tendentious commentaries. Despite that, the Serbian translation of Heksabiblos cannot be found in any monastery archive, leading to the assumption that it has never been translated in Serbia.

The Code of Justinian 
The Code of Justinian’s main sources were Code on Agriculture, Eclogue (compilation of Byzantine law) issued by Leo III and his son Constantine, Prochiron (law book) by Basil I, Basilika  (imperial laws) by Leo VI the Wise, the amendments made by Byzantine emperors, as well some legal texts collections.

The greatest part of the Code of Justinian was devoted to the regulation of legal relationships in rural environments. Traditional Slavic way of land cultivation and crop farming, as well as the forms of interpersonal legal relations within a community, after the Slavs had inhabited the Byzantine territory, were gradually changing. Over time the influence of the Byzantine law started to grow even in regulating agricultural relations, but the old customs could not be eradicated completely. In every economic system, agricultural relations can be classified as a relatively conservative group of relationships, so it is not surprising that a legal document intended for the regulation of the life in the countryside could be used over a long period of time. Those legal solutions were passed from one generation to another inasmuch as they were adjusted to new circumstances and needs. Therefore, the Byzantine Code on Agriculture was a significant legal source used across a very large territory and by a multitude of nations.

The Serbian version of the Code on Agriculture can be found in a manuscript from the 15th century. In the Code of Justinian there are 13 provisions adopted from the Greek edition of the Code on Agriculture edited and translated by William Ashburner.  Besides, three articles from the Code of Justinian are missing in the Serbian edition of the Code on Agriculture. It can only be assumed that that the articles in questions were those damaged in the Serbian version so much that they became unreadable or that they originally were in the part of the text which has not been preserved at all. These article can be found in the Greek edition, so we can find them in Ashburner’s edition. The Code of Justinian adopted only those provisions regulating legal relations related to agriculture in its narrow sense, such as in the case of ploughing up neighbour’s boundary, a self-willed cultivation of somebody else’s field, exchange of the fields between the landowners, different types of disputes over fields, a dispute among villages about their boundaries, making agreement about the cultivation of vineyards and so on. The order of the articles is not always the same, so they appear disordered. However, some articles related to agriculture were not transferred.

Although the majority of the articles were intended for the regulation of legal relations in the countryside, some provisions of the Code of Justinian have more general scope of application, which means that they can be applied to everyday life in rural environments or to some other contexts. Namely, the provisions in questions could be applicable to other types of settlements.

The Mining Code 
Stefan Lazarević promulgated the Mining Code in 1412. That Code was intended for all miners and mines of Novo Brdo. As the citizens requested, Despot Stefan demanded that a body consisting of 24 people be formed. Their task was to draft a new law and submit it to Despot Stefan for its confirmation and issuance in the form of a charter. The aim of this Code was to ensure an efficient and undisturbed performance of mining activities. The first out of two parts of this Code had 51 articles regulating the right of ventilation and conducting air through other trenches as well as the relations related to the open cut mine and mine pits. The other one containing 22 articles stipulated taxes and duties. A large number of provisions had been transferred to a so-called Saxon law at the time of Suleiman the Magnificent’s rule (1520-1566) and these provisions were translated into the Ottoman Turkish language. There is a well preserved transcript of the Mining Code in the Latin alphabet dating back to the 17th century.

Statutes 
The basic legal sources in the seaside communities such as Kotor, Budva, Skadar, Bar and Ulcinj were statutes. Those were complications of rule books, according to the level of autonomy each of those settlements had reached. They contained the provisions stipulating the rights and obligations of the power holders, family law and law of wills, organization of authority, property law and law of contract, criminal law and court proceedings. Because of their legal merit, the provisions of the statute were written together in a legal corpus in order to enable the application and long-term usage of the statutory provisions. The statutes of Kotor, Budva and Skadar have been preserved, while the existence of the statutes of Bar and Ulcinj has been confirmed, although they have not been preserved.

References

Medieval Serbian state
Serbian